The Midlands cricket team was a first-class cricket team representing the Midlands province in Zimbabwe. They competed in the Logan Cup from 1999 until the competition was revamped after the 2004–05 season. The club played their home matches at the Kwekwe Sports Club.

First-class record

References 

Former senior cricket clubs in Zimbabwe
Former Zimbabwean first-class cricket teams
History of Zimbabwean cricket
Cricket teams in Zimbabwe